Le Pré-Saint-Gervais (simply known by locals as Le Pré, i.e. "the meadow") is a commune in the northeastern suburbs of Paris, France. With a density of 25,643 inhabitants per square kilometres as of 2017, Le Pré-Saint-Gervais is one of the most densely populated municipalities in Europe.

History

In 1767, Johann Schobert, a German composer at the Palace of Versailles went mushroom picking with his family in Le Pré-Saint-Gervais, and died after insisting on eating them in a soup after two chefs told him that they were poisonous.

On 1 January 1860, the city of Paris was enlarged by annexing neighboring communes. On that occasion, a large part of the commune of Le Pré-Saint-Gervais was annexed to Paris, and forms now the neighborhood of Pré-Saint-Gervais, in the 19th arrondissement of Paris, leaving Le Pré-Saint-Gervais as a rump commune.

Heraldry

Population

Transport
No station of the Paris Métro, RER, or suburban rail network is in Le Pré-Saint-Gervais. The closest Métro stations are Hoche on Line  to the north, and Pré-Saint-Gervais on Line  to the southwest, each a few hundred metres outside the commune.

Education
Schools in the commune:
 Public preschools (maternelles): École Baudin, École Rosa-Parks, École Suzanne-Lacore, École Nelson-Mandela
 Public elementaries: École Anatole-France, École Jean-Jaurès, École Pierre-Brossolette
 Public junior high school: Collège Jean-Jacques-Rousseau
 Private preschool through junior high school: École et collège Saint-Joseph
 Private preschool: École maternelle Montessori

Personalities
Le Pré-Saint-Gervais is the birthplace of Louis Wagner, the first race car driver to win the United States Grand Prix.

See also
Communes of the Seine-Saint-Denis department

References

External links

 Official website 

Communes of Seine-Saint-Denis